Nikolis Apostolis was a Greek naval commander during the Greek War of Independence.

Apostolis was born on the island of Psara in 1770. He was initiated into the Filiki Eteria in 1818. When the revolt against the Ottoman Empire broke out in 1821, he took part in the naval struggles at the head of the Psarian squadron. Apostolis continued the struggle even after his native Psara was attacked and sacked by the Turks in 1824. He helped supply the army and people of Messolonghi by running through the Ottoman blockade during the final siege of that city.

He died in Aegina on 6 April 1827.

1770 births
1827 deaths
People from Psara
Greek admirals
Members of the Filiki Eteria
Greek people of the Greek War of Independence
18th-century Greek people